The Art of Being Nick is an American sitcom pilot created by Bruce Helford, that aired on NBC as a special on August 27, 1987. The pilot stars Scott Valentine as environmental artist, Nick Moore, who appeared as Mallory's (Justine Bateman) boyfriend in Family Ties. Also in the cast were Kristine Sutherland, Julia Louis-Dreyfus, and John Daman.

Overview
Due to the popularity of the Nick Moore character, three versions of a spin-off were produced. In the first incarnation titled Taking It Home, Nick returns to Detroit to live with his sister and grandfather (portrayed by Herschel Bernardi). After Bernardi's death in May 1986, the series was canceled. The second version features Nick working in a day care center for juvenile delinquents.

In the final version, Nick, his sister (Kristine Sutherland) and her son (John Daman) live together in an East Village apartment with Nick working in a bookstore.

The Art of Being Nick aired on August 27, 1987. Despite garnering solid ratings, NBC didn't pick the series up reportedly due to the network's reluctance to lose the popular Nick character from Family Ties.

Cast
 Scott Valentine as Nick Moore
 Kristine Sutherland as Marlene Moore
 Julia Louis-Dreyfus as Rachel
 John Daman as Louis
 Ray Buktenica as Bob

References

External links
 

1987 television specials
1980s American television specials
NBC television specials
Television pilots not picked up as a series
Television series by CBS Studios